Smith v. Cain, 565 U.S. 73, 132 S. Ct. 627 (2012), is a United States Supreme Court decision clarifying the Brady v. Maryland standard for criminal discovery. Joshua Dressler has called Smith v. Cain the "most recent pronouncement on the discovery issue."

Facts 
The defendant, Juan Smith, was convicted of murdering five people during an armed robbery based upon the testimony of a single witness. Smith appealed the verdict because the prosecution failed to disclose statements made by that witness to an investigator prior to trial that the witness:

 could not provide a description of the robbery perpetrators other then that they were black males;
 could not identify anyone because he could not see their faces; and 
 would not know the robbers if he saw them.

All Louisiana state courts rejected Smith's appeal and the Supreme Court granted certiorari.

Holding 
The issue before the Court was whether or not the suppressed statements by the sole witness were material under Brady v. Maryland. If so, the prosecution had violated Smith's due process rights. The Court held that they were.

The Court began its analysis recounting the standard on materiality set forth in United States v. Bagley, which states that evidence is material when "there is a reasonable probability that, had the evidence been disclosed, the result of the proceeding would have been different." As the Court explained, quoting Kyles v. Whitley, the "reasonable probability" standard looks to whether "the likelihood of a different result is great enough to 'undermine confidence in the outcome of the trial.'”

The Court stated that the witness's statements were "plainly material," because they were the only evidence linking the defendant to the crime.

References 

Due Process Clause
United States Supreme Court cases